"No Me Acuerdo"  is a song by Mexican singer Thalía and Dominican singer Natti Natasha. It was released on June 1, 2018 as the lead single from Thalía's fifteenth studio album, Valiente (2018). The track was written by Natasha, Rafael Pina, Gaby Music, Germán Hernández, Yasmil Marrufo, Frank Santofimio, Mario Cáceres, Jon Leone and Oscarito, and produced by the latter five. Thalía became the first Mexican artist to hit one billion views on YouTube with "No Me Acuerdo". "No Me Acuerdo" is also one of the best-selling Latin singles in the United States and was certified with 14× Platinum (Latin).

Commercial performance
The song performed well in charts all over the world and it was the most listened song of the summer of 2018 in Latin America. It was certified gold and platinum in Brazil, Mexico, Spain, and the United States.

Music video
The accompanying music video was filmed in Manhattan, New York; it is about a girl having a crazy fun night out with her friends, possibly cheating on her partner, and then the next day pretending not to remember anything of what happened the day before. The video went viral and accumulated more than 1 billion views on YouTube, making her the first Mexican artist to reach that milestone on a single video while also becoming Natasha's third video to achieve this. The video has now received over 1.2 billion views as of December 2020.

Live performances
Thalía and Natti Natasha first performed the song together during the K Love Live special concert "Las Que Mandan" where they had a mishap with the audio when it shut off. They performed the song again at the 2019 Premios Lo Nuestro Awards but this time in a remix version with Lali after performing Lindo Pero Bruto.

Charts

Weekly charts

Year-end charts

Certifications and sales

Covers
In November 2020, the South Korean girl group Purple Kiss covered the song as part of their international medley of covers of the top female vocalist from each country.

References

Thalía songs
2018 singles
Sony Music Latin singles
Spanish-language songs
2018 songs
Natti Natasha songs
Songs written by Rafael Pina
Songs with feminist themes